Sofia Ameli Gojić (born 5 February 1968) is a Croatian mezzo-soprano. She is principal opera singer and vocal coach at Croatian National Theatre in Zagreb..

Early life and training 
Sofia Ameli Gojić was born in Sisak, Croatia, where she started her education in music and performing arts. When she was thirteen years old, Croatian composer V. Rakijas, inspired by her singing, composed a song for her, which she premiered and recorded for  Croatian radio and television. 

She studied opera singing at the Academy of Music, University of Zagreb, in the class of Prof. Nada Puttar-Gold. and completed a degree in singing. She continued her postgraduate studies at the University of Music and Performing Arts in Vienna, Austria, in the class of Prof. Leopold Spitzer. She also worked with distinguished pedagogue Stojan Stojanov Gancev.

Career 
After finishing her studies, she was engaged as a soloist opera singer at the Opera of the Croatian National Theatre in Zagreb. At the same time, she performed as a guest singer in other opera houses and concert halls in Croatia, as well as in Austria, Bosnia and Herzegovina, Germany, Hungary, Italy, Macedonia, Montenegro, Serbia and Slovenia. She started her career as a soprano and in the first twelve years she sang a large number of title and leading roles such as Rosina, Mimì, Musetta, Violetta Valery, Hanna Glawary, Marzenka, Abigaille, Suor Angelica, Santuzza and others. In 2002, after performing the role of Santuzza, she received offers to sing mezzo-soprano roles. From 2002 she has sung a large number of mezzo-soprano and alto roles, among which are the roles of Amneris, Azucena, Carmen, Eboli, Fenena, Ulrica, Princess Clarice and Zia Principessa. She has performed leading roles in contemporary operas, such as Greta (The Metamorphosis), Marianne (Stories from the Vienna Forest), Girl (Talk to me about Augusta) and Mrs. Steel (Penguins). 

She recorded various pieces of contemporary music and different projects for Croatian Radio and Television, RTV Macedonia, RTV Montenegro, Radio Television of Serbia and Swiss Television. Her artistic activities include concerts with Zagreb Philharmonic Orchestra, Croatian Radio and Television Symphony Orchestra, Croatian Chamber Orchestra, Orchestra of the Ljubljana Opera, Cantus Ensemble, String Orchestra Dusan Skovran, Montenegrin Symphony Orchestra etc. She has participated in Opera Festivals and Festivals of Contemporary music: Music Biennale Zagreb, Gostic Days, Days of Croatian Music, Grosseto Festival, May Opera Evenings in Skopje, Kampnagel in Hamburg, International Miskolc Opera Festival and others

In the year 2005 she was awarded for life achievements with the Gold Medal of „Mare Nostrum Croaticum“ as the youngest opera singer who won this award ever. In the 2018/19 season as a vocal coach, she prepared the artists of the Ballet of the Croatian National Theatre for singing in the ballet production Apoksiomen. In the seasons of 2020/21 and 2021/22 she will sing the roles of Azucena, Carmen and Ulrica.

Roles

Personal life 
Sofia Ameli Gojić lives with her husband, Croatian actor Dušan Gojić and their daughter in Zagreb, Croatia

References 

20th-century Croatian women opera singers
1968 births
Living people
21st-century Croatian women opera singers